Sagamore Pendry Baltimore is a former warehouse in the heart of the Fells Point neighborhood in Baltimore. The head house formally known as the Recreation Pier or Rec Pier stood vacant for more than 15 years. The brick Beaux Arts building originally stored port cargo.

History
Sagamore Pendry Baltimore is located within the 1700 Block of Thames Street, it opened on August 20, 1914; built by the city at a cost of over $1 million ($24 million USD today) as a commercial pier by Theodore Wells Pietsch I. The Recreation Pier as it was known served as a landing point for thousands of new immigrants processed across the Patapsco river at the Locust Point immigration station. The ferry continued to serve as an important social and economic link between the Fells Point and Locust Point communities until it finally closed in 1937. Over the years the premises served a number of roles such as a meeting place for early 20th-century Baltimore immigrants with a rooftop playground space for children, to a maritime radio station headquartered within the pier. It was also used as a parking garage.

In fiction
From 1993-1999, the pier had been occupied as the police headquarters for the television series, Homicide: Life on the Street.  More recently it was the set of the fictional Maryland School for the arts in the films Step Up and Step Up 2: the Streets.

Restoration and reuse
Over the years, many developers have tried to transform the 100-year-old pier. Previous developers struggled to find financing for the project because the pier needed so much work. A major piece of the pier's restoration involved replacing the pilings that are driven underwater and into the Baltimore harbor bed, an expensive undertaking. The restoration of the pier clocked in 200,000 worker-hours, $250,000 worth of asbestos and $300,000 worth of lead paint removal alone. Developers also had to comply with preservation rules, and address potential flood risks. 

Sagamore Pendry Baltimore, was designed by New York and Baltimore based BHC Architects, constructed by Whiting Turner with interiors by Patrick Sutton Design.  The building reopened in March of 2017.

References

Beaux-Arts architecture in Maryland
Hotels in Maryland
Buildings and structures in Baltimore
Industrial buildings completed in 1914